Marianne Simson (July 29, 1920 – July 15, 1992) was a German dancer and film actress.

She was born in Berlin as the daughter of an insurance clerk John Edward Simson. Her brother was Helmut Simson, who later served as mayor of Wolfsburg. Originally trained as a ballerina, she made her screen debut in Frisions in Distress (1935) and went on to appear in another seventeen films over the next decade, generally in supporting roles.

In 1944 she informed on a Germany army major to the Gestapo for allegedly making comments supportive of the 20 July plot  to assassinate Adolf Hitler. Following the defeat of Germany, Simson was arrested by the Soviet NKVD and placed in a series of detention camps. In 1950 she was sentenced to eight years in prison, but was given an early release in 1952 and moved to West Germany. She worked as a choreographer in some stage productions, and married the theatre director Wilhelm List Diehl.

Selected filmography

References

Bibliography
 Barker, Peter. GDR and Its History. Rodopi, 2000.

External links

1920 births
1992 deaths
German film actresses
Actresses from Berlin